This is a list of aquatic heteropteran bug species recorded in Britain.

Family Nepidae 
 Nepa cinerea
 Ranatra linearis

Family Corixidae 
 Micronecta scholtzi
 Micronecta griseola
 Micronecta minutissima
 Micronecta poweri
 Cymatia bonsdorffii
 Cymatia coleoptrata
 Glaencorisa propinqua
 Arctocorisa carinata
 Arctocorisa germari
 Callicorixa praeusta
 Callicorixa wollastoni
 Corixa affinis
 Corixa dentipes
 Corixa iberica
 Corixa panzeri
 Corixa punctata
 Hesperocorixa castanea
 Hesperocorixa linnaei
 Hesperocorixa moesta
 Hesperocorixa sahlbergi
 Paracorixa concinna
 Sigara selecta
 Sigara stagnalis
 Sigara nigrolineata
 Sigara limitata
 Sigara semistriata
 Sigara venusta
 Sigara dorsalis
 Sigara striata
 Sigara distincta
 Sigara falleni
 Sigara fallenoidea
 Sigara fossarum
 Sigara scotti
 Sigara lateralis

Family Naucoridae 
 Ilyocoris cimicoides
 Naucoris maculatus

Family Aphelocheiridae 
 Aphelocheirus aestivalis

Family Notonectidae 
 Notonecta glauca
 Notonecta maculata
 Notonecta obliqua
 Notonecta viridis

Family Pleidae 
 Plea minutissima

Family Mesoveliidae 
 Mesovelia furcata

Family Hebridae 
 Hebrus pusillus
 Hebrus ruficeps

Family Hydrometridae 
 Hydrometra gracilenta
 Hydrometra stagnorum

Family Veliidae 
 Microvelia buenoi
 Microvelia pygmaea
 Microvelia reticulata
 Velia caprai
 Velia saulii

Family Gerridae 
 Aquarius najas
 Aquarius paludum
 Gerris argentatus
 Gerris costae
 Gerris gibbifer
 Gerris lacustris
 Gerris odontogaster
 Gerris thoracicus
 Gerris lateralis
 Limnoporus rufoscutellatus

See also 
 Heteropteran
 British Isles

References 

 Brooke, Sheila (2004) A checklist of British water bugs (Hemiptera-Heteroptera) Het News (Newsletter of the Heteroptera Recording Schemes) 2nd series No 3 pp 8 - 10

Aquatic Heteroptera, Britain
Heteropteran